The Order of Courage may refer to:

 , a state decoration of the partially recognized republic of Abkhazia
 Order of Courage (Iran), a state decoration of Iran
 Order of Courage (Russia), a state decoration of Russia